Culex (Lophoceraomyia) sinensis is a species of mosquito belonging to the genus Culex. It is found in Australia, Bangladesh, Cambodia, China, Hong Kong, India, Indonesia, Japan, South Korea, Laos, Malaysia, Myanmar, Nepal, New Guinea (Island); Papua New Guinea, Philippines, Russia, Sri Lanka, Sudan and South Sudan, Taiwan, Thailand, and Vietnam. It is a possible vector of Wuchereria bancrofti.

References

External links 
Culex sinensis Theo. a possible vector of Wuchereria bancrofti in Calcutta.

sinensis
Insects described in 1903